The Burundi Billie Jean King Cup team represents Burundi in Billie Jean King Cup tennis competition and are governed by the Fédération de Tennis du Burundi. They currently compete in the Europe/Africa Zone of Group III.

History
Burundi competed in its first Billie Jean King Cup in 2022. Their best result was finishing third in their Group III pool in 2022.

Players

Recent performances
Here is the list of all match-ups of the Burundi participation in the Billie Jean King Cup in 2022.

See also
Billie Jean King Cup
Burundi Davis Cup team

References

External links

Billie Jean King Cup teams
Billie Jean King Cup
Billie Jean King Cup